Nicholas Tichborne (b. at Hartley Mauditt, Hampshire; executed at Tyburn, London, 24 August 1601) was an English Roman Catholic layman, a recusant and Catholic martyr. He is to be distinguished from the Nicholas Tichborne who died in Winchester Gaol in 1587 who was his father.

Life

He was at large in 1592, but by 14 March 1597, had been imprisoned. On that date he gave evidence against various members of his family. Before 3 November 1598, he had obtained his liberty and had effected the release of his brother, Thomas Tichborne, a prisoner in the Gatehouse, Westminster, by assaulting his keeper.

With him was executed Thomas Hackshott (b. at Mursley, Buckinghamshire), who was condemned on the same charge, viz. that of effecting the escape of the priest Thomas Tichborne.

References

Richard Challoner, Missionary Priests, I, no. 127;
John Hungerford Pollen, English Martyrs 1584-1603 (London, privately printed for the Catholic Record Soc., 1908), 361, 395;

1601 deaths
English Roman Catholics
17th-century Roman Catholic martyrs
Year of birth unknown
16th-century births
17th-century English people
People executed under Elizabeth I
People from East Hampshire District
Executed people from Hampshire
Venerable martyrs of England and Wales